Tazehkand-e Ziaabad (also Romanized as Tāzehkand-e Ẕīāābād; also known as Tāzehkand) is a village in Zanjanrud-e Bala Rural District, in the Central District of Zanjan County, Zanjan Province, Iran. At the 2006 census, its population was 228, in 52 families.

References 

Populated places in Zanjan County